Savignia kawachiensis is a species of sheet weaver found in Japan. It was described by Oi in 1960.

References

Linyphiidae
Chelicerates of Japan
Spiders of Asia
Spiders described in 1960